Aïda Ruilova (born 1974 in West Virginia) is an American contemporary artist.

Life 
Ruilova studied at the University of South Florida, Tampa and the School of Visual Arts, New York. She lives and works in New York City with her husband and fellow artist Raymond Pettibon, with whom she has a son.

Work 
Based on her early involvement in various independent avant-garde rock formations, Ruilova began to work and experiment with video in the late 1990s. With music continuing to be an important part of her practice in terms of a special rhythmic connection and the sound design of her films remained. Today she is mainly known as a video artist, but she also works in other media such as sculpture, drawing or graphics, which she installs in her exhibitions together with her videos and connects visually and auditorily in a relationship. Sexuality, obsessions and violence, as well as cinematographic and pop cultural references, are important fields of reference for her artistic work.

Her work has been shown in numerous galleries and group exhibitions, including representation in multiple international Art Biennials, and nominated for the Hugo Boss Prize for contemporary art in 2006.

Solo exhibitions (selection) 

 2018 Galerie Guido W. Baudach, lips, pipes and banana, Berlin
 2017 Fortnight Institute, Smoke Gets In Your Eyes, New York
 2016 Marlborough Chelsea, The Pink Palace, New York
 2014 Galerie Guido W. Baudach, Hey… Oh no… You're Pretty…, Berlin
 2013 Kayne Griffin Corcoran, I'm So Wild about your Strawberry Mouth, Los Angeles
 2011 Salon 94 Bowery, Goner, New York
 2010 Centro de Arte Contemporáneo La Conservera, Aïda Ruilova, Ceutí, Spain
 2009 Contemporary Art Center New Orleans, The Singles: 1999 – Now, New Orleans
 2008 Aspen Art Museum, The Singles: 1999 – Now, Aspen
 2007 Salon 94 Freemans, Lulu, New York
 2007 The Kitchen, The Silver Globe, New York
 2003 Center for Curatorial Studies, Bard College, Untitled, Annandale-on-Hudson, USA
 2000 White Columns, White Room, New York

Group exhibitions (selection) 

 2018 Hiromi Yoshii Gallery, In media res, Tokyo
 2016 Frost Art Museum, Resonance/Dissonance, Miami
 2015 Haus der Kunst, Die kalte Libido – Sammlung Goetz im Haus der Kunst, Munich
 2015 MACBA, PUNK. Its Traces in Contemporary Art, Barcelona
 2014 PAC Padiglione D' Arte Contemporanea, The Crime was Almost Perfect, Milan
 2013 MoMA Library, Reading List: Artists' Selections from the MoMA Library Collection, New York
 2012 SCAD Museum of Art, Pose/Re-Pose, Savannah
 2011 54th Venice Biennale, Garage Projects, Commercial Break, Venice
 2011 Institute of Contemporary Arts, Festival of Ideas, ICA, London
 2011 Schirn Kunsthalle, Geheimgesellschaften / Secret Societies, Frankfurt
 2010 Solomon R. Guggenheim Museum, Haunted: Contemporary Photography/Video/Performance, New York
 2010 KW Institute for Contemporary Art, Highlights from the Cologne Kunstfilmbiennale in Berlin, Berlin
 2009 Museo Universitario de Arte Contemporáneo, Las líneas de la mano, Mexico-City
 2008 Fondazione Nicola Trussardi, Tarantula, Milan
 2007 The Second Biennial of New Visual Art Performance, Performa07, The Silver Globe, New York
 2007 ZKM, Between two deaths, Karlsruhe
 2007 2nd Moscow Biennale, Moscow
 2006 Kunstmuseum Bern, Six Feet Under, Bern
 2006 4. Berlin Biennale für zeitgenössische Kunst, Von Mäusen und Menschen, Berlin
 2005 P.S.1 Contemporary Art Center, Greater New York 2005, New York
 2005 Bronx Museum, IRREDUCIBLE: Contemporary Short Form Video, 1995-2005, New York
 2004 Academy of Fine Arts, Philadelphia
 2003 Museum of Contemporary Art, Chicago
 2003 New Museum at Field Day, New York
 2001 Stedelijk Museum voor Actuele Kunst (S.M.A.K), Casino 2001, Ghent
 1999 Museu Nacional de Historia Natural, Hi-8, Lisbon

References

External links 
 

1974 births
Living people
American contemporary artists
People from Wheeling, West Virginia
American women artists
21st-century American women